Palouse Ridge Golf Club is an 18-hole championship golf course in the northwest United States, located at Washington State University in Pullman, Washington. On the east edge of campus on the Palouse of the Inland Northwest, it opened for play  in 2008 and is the home venue of the Cougar golf teams of the Pac-12 Conference.

Palouse Ridge replaced a sub-standard nine-hole "WSU Golf Course" that opened in 1925, and was mostly an unimproved recreational track. It had dual tees, but measured under  for par 72, with a course rating of 65.4 and a slope of 110. The first and ninth holes originally extended west to Stadium Way, now a parking lot, and later began on the east side of Bailey–Brayton Field, in the area now occupied by tennis courts. (Replacement holes were constructed on the east end of the layout, in the area now occupied by the 18th (reversed) and 9th holes.)

Long targeted for an upgrade, the WSU course closed in 2006 and was plowed under for the $12.3 million redesign project, constructed on part of the same site and adjacent land.

The 18-hole Palouse Ridge course opened in 2008 on August 29, and intends to improve the school's golf teams, provide a laboratory for students in turf grass courses, and give boosters and alumni an additional reason to visit campus. The course hosted NCAA golf with Pac-12 women's championship in 2012, the NCAA men's west regional in 2013, and the Pac-12 men's championship in 2015.

The city of Pullman had attempted to construct an 18-hole golf course in the early 1990s at the northwest part of the city, near the high school. After some local opposition, it was put before voters in November 1994, and failed.

Scorecard

Video
YouTube – WSU's Palouse Ridge Golf Club (2013)

References

External links

Washington State University Athletics – Palouse Ridge Golf Club
Golf Course Gurus – Palouse Ridge Golf Club
Oliphant Golf  – Palouse Ridge Golf Club

Golf clubs and courses in Washington (state)
College golf clubs and courses in the United States
Pullman, Washington
Washington State University
Buildings and structures in Whitman County, Washington
Tourist attractions in Whitman County, Washington
2008 establishments in Washington (state)